Mecistogaster asticta is a species of damselfly in the family Pseudostigmatidae which is endemic to Brazil. Its natural habitat is subtropical or tropical moist lowland forests, where it is threatened by deforestation.

References

Fauna of Brazil
Pseudostigmatidae
Insects described in 1860
Endemic fauna of Brazil
Taxonomy articles created by Polbot
Taxobox binomials not recognized by IUCN